The Cheerleaders (U.K. theatrical title: The 18 Year Old Schoolgirls) is a 1973 comedy film directed by Paul Glickler, starring Stephanie Fondue and Denise Dillaway.

Plot
A group of high school cheerleaders have sex with the opposing team's players to make them too tired to play football properly, allowing their team to win an unprecedented series of games.

Cast
 Stephanie Fondue (actual name Enid Finnbogason) as Jeannie
 Denise Dillaway as Claudia
 Jovita Bush as Bonnie
 Sandy Evans as Suzie
 Kim Stanton as Patty
 Brandy Woods
 Raoul Hoffnung as Novi
 Jonathan Jacobs as Norm
 Richard Meatwhistle as Jon
 Partick Wright as Coach Gannon
 Janus Blythe as Cheerleader

Production

The film was made in the summer of 1972 in the cities of Cupertino, California and Sunnyvale, California.  The high school scenes were shot at Monta Vista High School in Cupertino, California. The administration of Monta Vista high school claimed to not be aware of the racy elements and theme of the movie. Many of the football player extras were recent graduates of local high schools from these two cities. The red uniforms in the film representing the home team high school Amarosa High School were actual uniforms of Fremont High School in Sunnyvale, California from that same year. One of the identified extras is Carl Ekern, who later played professional football for the Los Angeles Rams. He was a student football player at San Jose State University when the movie was made.

Sequels
The film's success spawned a series of sequels during the 1970s. It was followed by The Swinging Cheerleaders (1974), directed by Jack Hill, Revenge of the Cheerleaders (1976), directed by Richard Lerner, and The Great American Girl Robbery (1979) (a.k.a. Cheerleaders' Wild Weekend), directed by Jeff Werner.

See also
 List of American films of 1973

References

External links

1973 films
1970s exploitation films
1973 comedy films
American comedy films
American independent films
Cheerleading films
1970s English-language films
American exploitation films
Films shot in California
Films about rape
Troma Entertainment films
Teensploitation
1970s American films